Jon Ander may refer to:

Jon Ander (footballer, born 1990), Spanish football forward
Jon Ander (footballer, born 1995), Spanish football goalkeeper